The Toyota bZ series ("beyond Zero") is a family of battery electric vehicles (BEV) manufactured by Toyota. It was introduced in April 2021 alongside the bZ4X Concept. The bZ series is a part of Toyota's plan to introduce 15 battery electric vehicle models by 2025, seven of which are from the bZ series. Vehicles from the bZ series make use of the e-TNGA platform co-developed with Subaru.

According to Toyota, the "beyond Zero" name is intended to convey the desire to provide customers with value that exceeds mere "zero emissions." The company described the bZ series as a "human-centered" approach aimed for regions such as China, North America, and Europe, where there are growing demand for BEVs.

Its first vehicle, the bZ4X, is produced in Japan and China and has been sold since mid-2022. The second model, called bZ3, was introduced in October 2022 to be sold exclusively in China in 2023. It is co-developed with BYD Auto through the BYD Toyota EV Technology (BTET) joint venture.

Production models 
 Toyota bZ3 (2023-present)
 Toyota bZ4X (2022–present)

Patent fillings in 2020 revealed that Toyota had registered nine nameplates under the bZ series, which include bZ1, bZ2, bZ2X, bZ3, bZ3X, bZ4, bZ4X, bZ5, and bZ5X. The numbers refer to the vehicle size or segment, while the 'X' denotes to the vehicle being a crossover SUV.

Concept models 

In December 2021, Toyota revealed the bZ Compact SUV, bZ Large SUV, bZ Small Crossover, and bZ SDN (sedan) concept vehicles as part of the bZ series. The four bZ concepts were displayed as part of an event that showcased fifteen future Toyota and Lexus battery electric models. The bZ SDN was later revealed as the bZ3 in October 2022.

An updated bZ Compact SUV concept was shown at the 2022 Los Angeles Auto Show in November.

References 

bZ
Production electric cars